Hans may refer to:


People
 Hans (name), a masculine given name
 Hans Raj Hans, Indian singer and politician
 Navraj Hans, Indian singer, actor, entrepreneur, cricket player and performer, son of Hans Raj Hans
 Yuvraj Hans, Punjabi actor and singer, son of Hans Raj Hans
 Hans clan, a tribal clan in Punjab, Pakistan

Places
 Hans, Marne, a commune in France
 Hans Island, administrated by Greenland and Canada

Arts and entertainment
 Hans (film) a 2006 Italian film directed by Louis Nero
 Hans (Frozen), the main antagonist of the 2013 Disney animated film Frozen
 Hans (magazine), an Indian Hindi literary monthly
 Hans, a comic book drawn by Grzegorz Rosiński and later by Zbigniew Kasprzak

Other uses
 Clever Hans, the "wonder horse"
 The Hans India, an English language newspaper in India
 HANS device, a racing car safety device
Hans, the ISO 15924 code for Simplified Chinese script

See also
Han (disambiguation)
Hans im Glück, a German card and game publisher
Hans im Glück aus Herne 2, a German television series